Avold R. Kaplan (November 16, 1899 – December 28, 1989) was an American football player.  A native of Owatonna, Minnesota, he played college football for Hamline and professional football in the National Football League (NFL) as a halfback and quarterback for the Minneapolis Marines. He appeared in eight NFL games, all as a starter, during the 1923 season.

References

1899 births
1989 deaths
Players of American football from Minnesota
Minneapolis Marines players
People from Owatonna, Minnesota